Psidium acidum is a species of tree in the family Myrtaceae. It is native to Peru and Ecuador.

References

Trees of Peru
Trees of Ecuador
acidum